Secret History of Empress Wu, also known as Wu Zetian Mishi, is a Chinese television series based on the life of Wu Zetian, the only woman in Chinese history to assume the title of Empress Regnant. The series was directed by Cheng Feng and starred three actresses — Yin Tao, Liu Xiaoqing and Siqin Gaowa — as Wu Zetian, each playing the empress at a different stage of her life. It was first broadcast in mainland China on Hunan Satellite TV on 5 November 2011.

Plot
Wu Meiniang entered the palace at the age of 14 to become Emperor Taizong's concubine after her father courageously sacrified his life for the emperor's safety in the war. Emperor Taizong soon is told that she was destined to bring destruction to the Li family, so he refused to let her enter his bedchamber. Wu Meiniang was neglected for 12 years. Emperor Taizong eventually felled sick, and told his young son Li Zhi to secretly kill her. Wu Meiniang found out and decided to seduce Li Zhi in order to live. After Emperor Taizong's death, she was forced to serve as a nun being the concubine of a former Emperor. She shaved her hair and was ridiculed by the other nuns.

Li Zhi was the new Emperor, as Emperor Gaozong of Tang. Zhangsun Wuji was Li Zhi's uncle and brother to his mother, Empress Wende, and he withheld most of the political power, which makes Li Zhi a figurehead emperor. Li Zhi was frequently displeased with his wife Empress Wang for being too controlling and jealous of his favorite concubine, Consort Xiao. Yet, he could not forget the affair he had with Wu Meiniang. Empress Wang decided to bring back Wu Meiniang to make Consort Xiao jealous and recover Li Zhi's love with her but failed, and Wu Meiniang was reunited with Li Zhi. Both Empress Wang and Consort Xiao became jealous and desperately want to kill Meiniang to keep their positions in the palace. Wu Meiniang gave birth to her first son, Li Hong, and is promoted to the rank of Zhaoyi. She also gave birth to a daughter, Princess Anding. But being frequently harmed by her enemies since she entered the palace, she realized that to survive she needs to be Empress, and helps Li Zhi wipe out all of their enemies, including Zhangsun Wuji, who frequently manipulated him. So she strangled her newborn daughter and blamed Empress Wang but Empress Wang denied and further accused Meiniang for killing her own daughter and blaming her. Li Zhi wanted to depose the Empress, but Zhangsun Wuji opposes. The case was terminated.

Wu Meiniang, now Consort Wu, was ambitious, and further accused both Empress Wang and Consort Xiao of witchcraft. Li Zhi was angered, stripped both Empress Wang and Consort Xiao' titles and threw them both into the Cold Palace. On Wu Meiniang's orders, Empress Wang and Consort Xiao were frequently beaten to death, had their hands and feet cut off and suffocated in wine jars after they intended to take revenge on Meiniang by poisoning her son. She also removed Zhangsun Wuji from his position, and he committed suicide in exile. Wu Meiniang was elevated to the position of Empress. She gave birth to four more children, three more sons and a daughter, Princess Taiping. Her life as Empress was peaceful, until her sister, the Lady of Han, returned to the palace.

The Lady of Han was Wu Meiniang's older sister, who was widowed at an early age. She had two children, Helan Minzhi and Helan Minyue from her marriage and often visited the palace. She used to have a close relationship with Wu Meiniang, but the Lady of Han decided to seduce Li Zhi when Wu Meiniang was still a consort. The Lady of Han craved affection and wanted to be the Empress and replace her younger sister, even wished for her sister's death, which hurted Wu Meiniang's feelings. Soon, the Lady of Han was pregnant with Li Zhi's child. Accusing her of plotting to harm her own younger sister and replace her position, Wu Meiniang decided to poison the Lady of Han and made her lose both pregnancy and further her life.

The Lady of Han's daughter, Helan Minyue suspected something was wrong with her mother's death. She felt that Empress Wu was the murderer and further gained the trust of her uncle, Li Zhi the Emperor. Helan Minyue wanted the spot of Empress to take revenge for her mother, and asked the Emperor to depose Empress Wu. As the Emperor was about to sign the deposing statement, Wu Meiniang rushed in and made Li Zhi feel pitiful. He then blamed the matter on an official named Shangguan Yi, and had his whole family executed except for his granddaughter, Shangguan Wan'er. Shangguan Wan'er became Wu Meiniang's secretary and also was in a romantic relationship with two of her sons.

Angered with Wu Meiniang's power and intelligent tricks, Helan Minyue united with Wu Meiniang's evil cousins and plotted to kill her to take revenge for her deceased mother. They invited Meiniang to a family dinner, poisoned the food, and further planned to burn down the palace to kill her. But Wu Meiniang soon acknowledged her cousins and niece' evil crimes and feared for her life to be threatened, so she let Helan Minyue to eat the poisonous food and then ordered to behead her cousins. After Helan Minyue's death, her brother Helan Minzhi decided to take his sister's place, assaulted most women in the palace and planned to kill Wu Meiniang, but he was later exiled and killed for good. She exiled all of the government officials against her, and replaced them with her allies. Her sons had frequently betrayed Wu Meiniang for holding too much power as an Empress, and worried that she would take over the dynasty that their ancestors had established. In the process, three of them committed suicide, were exiled or poisoned. The death of the Emperor Gaozong of Tang and Wu Meiniang's three sons received outrage from the public, mostly from the male traitors. They insisted that a woman like Wu Meiniang is not allowed to rule the Tang dynasty and advocated to murder her to restore the throne to the Li family but later defeated by Wu Meiniang's empire. Her youngest son decided to obey her, and gave up the throne after her husband's death and by the desire of the people in the whole country. Now a widow, she created her own dynasty and became the first and only female emperor of China.

Cast
 Yin Tao as Wu Zetian (young adult)
 Liu Xiaoqing as Wu Zetian (middle age)
 Siqin Gaowa as Wu Zetian (old age)
 Yu Shaoqun as Emperor Gaozong (young adult)
 Winston Chao as Emperor Gaozong (middle age)
 Tang Guoqiang as Emperor Taizong
 Xu Huangli as Princess Taiping (teenage)
 Zheng Shuang as Princess Taiping (adult)
 Gillian Chung as Shangguan Wan'er
 Qin Hailu as Lady of Han
 Jiang Linjing as Empress Wang
 Liu Peiqi as Shangguan Yi
 Guo Qiming as Xu Jingzong
 Lei Lei as Li Xian
 Kathy Yuen as Helan Minyue
 Shen Junyi as Zhangsun Wuji
 Li Na as Consort Xiao
 Zhou Xuan as Li Hong (young)
 Yuan Jiabao as Li Hong (adult)
 Wang Hao as Li Xian (Emperor Zhongzong)
 Tian Yupeng as Li Dan
 Liu Changde as Helan Minzhi
 Chen Jiming as Di Renjie
 Yang Hongwu as Pei Yan
 Zhang Bojun as Li Yifu
 Ding Chong as Deguan
 Ren Xihong as Wu Shihuo
 Chen Bing as Chu Suiliang
 Lu Xiaojuan as Princess Danyang
 Li Tingzhe as Zhao Daosheng
 Hu Gaofeng as Luo Binwang
 Bai Jincheng as Wang Fusheng
 Dong Yanlin as Xu Jingye
 Wu Youxi as Eunuch Liu
 Yang Yijia as Pei Wanying
 Ding Jialan as Wei Lian'er

Production
The series was co-produced by Hunan Broadcasting System, Hunan Satellite TV, and Zhejiang Changcheng Film and Television Media Group, with a budget of 60,000,000 yuan. Shooting started on 18 February 2011 and ended on 6 May in the same year. Filming locations include Wuxi and Hengdian World Studios.

See also
 Secret History of Princess Taiping

External links
 
  Secret History of Empress Wu on Sina.com

2011 Chinese television series debuts
Television series set in the Tang dynasty
Television series set in the Zhou dynasty (690–705)
Works about Wu Zetian
Chinese historical television series
Hunan Television dramas
Cultural depictions of Wu Zetian
Cultural depictions of Di Renjie
Television series set in the 7th century